Ab Bid-e Hajj Baba (also Romanized as Āb Bīd-e Ḩājj Bābā; also known as Āb Bīd-e Ḩājjī Bābā and Ab Bīd-e Hājī Bābā, and Āb-e Bīd) is a village in Kiyaras Rural District, in the Central District of Gotvand County, Khuzestan Province, Iran. At the 2006 census, its population was 336, in 53 families.

References 

Populated places in Gotvand County